El Lago is a city in Harris County, Texas, United States. The population was 3,090 at the 2020 census.

El Lago has particular historical significance as it sits on the site of one of the main hide-outs for the French pirate and privateer Jean Lafitte.

History

The city of El Lago was established in 1961 and over the years has been home to at least 47 astronauts, including Neil Armstrong, the first person to walk on the moon; Buzz Aldrin, the lunar module pilot on the 1969 Apollo 11 mission and the second person to walk on the moon; Jim Lovell, the command module pilot of Apollo 8 (making him one of the first three humans to fly to the Moon) and commander of the Apollo 13 mission; Story Musgrave, veteran of six space shuttle flights on five different orbiters; and Peggy Whitson, who in 2017 became the first female astronaut to command the International Space Station. Many houses in the neighborhood were custom built specifically for the astronauts and their families. The local elementary school is named for Ed White, who was the first american to walk in space, and there are two parks named for astronauts. There's the Neil Armstrong Park and McNair Memorial Park, named for astronaut Ronald McNair, who was killed when the space shuttle Challenger exploded. There is a pavilion named for Dr. Ellen Ochoa, a former astronaut and director of Johnson Space Center. In addition, the city's logo features a space shuttle.

Geography

El Lago is located at  (29.572147, –95.043680).

Demographics

As of the 2020 United States census, there were 3,090 people, 1,042 households, and 768 families residing in the city.

As of the census of 2000, there were 3,075 people, 1,303 households, and 870 families residing in the city. The population density was 4,709.3 people per square mile (1,826.6/km2). There were 1,409 housing units at an average density of 2,157.8/sq mi (837.0/km2). The racial makeup of the city was 94.50% White, 0.78% African American, 0.46% Native American, 1.40% Asian, 0.07% Pacific Islander, 1.37% from other races, and 1.43% from two or more races. Hispanic or Latino of any race were 5.04% of the population.

There were 1,303 households, out of which 27.0% had children under the age of 18 living with them, 58.1% were married couples living together, 6.0% had a female householder with no husband present, and 33.2% were non-families. 27.2% of all households were made up of individuals, and 5.4% had someone living alone who was 65 years of age or older. The average household size was 2.35 and the average family size was 2.89.

In the city, the population was spread out, with 22.1% under the age of 18, 6.0% from 18 to 24, 30.3% from 25 to 44, 29.0% from 45 to 64, and 12.6% who were 65 years of age or older. The median age was 41 years. For every 100 females, there were 108.5 males. For every 100 females age 18 and over, there were 106.4 males.

The median income for a household in the city was $66,223, and the median income for a family was $90,446. Males had a median income of $66,000 versus $40,302 for females. The per capita income for the city was $33,454. About 2.2% of families and 3.0% of the population were below the poverty line, including 3.0% of those under age 18 and 1.8% of those age 65 or over.

Government and infrastructure

The City of El Lago is a Type A general Municipality. Operating under a strong Mayoral form of government.  The City council is composed of 5 Council Persons and a non-voting Mayor.  The Mayors may vote to break a tie. Each position serves for a two-year term.

The Lakeview Police Department serves El Lago and Taylor Lake Village. In 1986 the two cities decided to merge their police departments. The merger was finished in January 1987. The administration is in El Lago.

The Seabrook Volunteer Fire Department provides fire services.

Harris Health System (formerly Harris County Hospital District) designated Strawberry Health Center in Pasadena for ZIP code 77586. The nearest public hospital is Ben Taub General Hospital in the Texas Medical Center.

Education
Pupils in El Lago attend schools in Clear Creek Independent School District. The community is within the Board of Trustees District 1,

The City of El Lago has two elementary school within the city boundaries; Ed White Elementary School. Other zoned schools include Seabrook Intermediate School (Seabrook), and Clear Falls High School (League City).

Residents were previously zoned to Clear Lake High School in Clear Lake City, Houston.

Bay Area Charter Elementary School is a state charter school located in El Lago.

The portion of Clear Creek ISD in Harris County (and therefore El Lago) is assigned to San Jacinto College.

Parks
Harris County Precinct 2 operates the Bay Area Community Center at 5002 NASA Road 1 in nearby Pasadena.

References

External links

 City of El Lago official website
 

Cities in Texas
Cities in Harris County, Texas
Greater Houston
Galveston Bay Area
Populated coastal places in Texas